The 1964 United States presidential election in Alaska took place on November 3, 1964, as part of the nationwide presidential election. Voters chose three representatives, or electors to the Electoral College, who voted for president and vice president.

Alaska was won by incumbent President Lyndon B. Johnson (D-Texas) with 65.9% of the popular vote against U.S. Senator Barry Goldwater (R-Arizona) with 34.1%. Johnson won the national vote as well, defeating Goldwater and serving a full term after finishing the assassinated John F. Kennedy's term. This is the only presidential election when Alaska has voted for a Democratic candidate, partially due to Johnson's landslide victory throughout the rest of the country (except for the Deep South and Goldwater's home state), and partially because during its first four presidential elections Alaska was not anomalously Republican relative to the nation at-large, which the state would become and remain very strongly from 1976 onwards. Indeed, despite Johnson's landslide, Alaska came out of the 1964 election as 4.63 percent more Democratic than the nation at-large on a two-party basis, and Johnson's 31-point margin is the second-largest by a presidential candidate of either party, only surpassed by Ronald Reagan in his 1984 landslide. This is also the only time any presidential candidate has won every single borough in the state. Had Goldwater won the state, Alaska would have never voted Democratic, and it would constitute the Republicans' longest voting streak up to the present day.

At a more local level, all boroughs and census areas voted for Johnson, and the relatively populous boroughs of Matanuska-Susitna and Ketchikan Gateway only voted for a Democratic candidate in this election since statehood – although Matanuska-Susitna was the most populous amongst fifteen county-equivalents who gave a plurality to Ross Perot in 1992. 

The Aleutians East Borough, Bristol Bay Borough, Fairbanks North Star, Kodiak Island, and Denali Borough have also not voted Democratic since, though Denali Borough also gave a plurality to Ross Perot. Anchorage would not vote for the Democratic candidate again until 2020.

Alaska was one of three states that voted with a certain party for the first time in this election, the other two being Vermont (which also had never gone to a Democrat before) and Georgia (which hadn't gone to a Republican before)--though these two had been states for much longer than Alaska and broke a streak lasting more than a century.

Results

See also
United States presidential elections in Alaska

References

Alaska
1964
1964 Alaska elections